Margaret Home, Countess of Moray (died 1683) was a Scottish aristocrat.

Family backgound
She was the eldest daughter of Alexander Home, 1st Earl of Home (died 1619) and Mary Sutton, Countess of Home (died 1644).

Her siblings were her brother, James Home, 2nd Earl of Home (d. 1633) who married firstly, Catherine Cary (1609–1626) eldest daughter of Viscount Falkland and the playwright Elizabeth Tanfield Cary author of The Tragedy of Mariam, and in 1626 married secondly Grace Fane (d. 1633) daughter of Francis Fane, 1st Earl of Westmorland and Mary Mildmay, and her younger sister, Anne Home, Countess of Lauderdale (d. 1671), who married John Maitland, 1st Duke of Lauderdale. Their daughter Mary Maitland married John Hay, 2nd Marquess of Tweeddale.

A Happy Husband
A Scottish author Patrick Hannay (fl. 1616–1630) dedicated A happy husband or, Directions for a Maide to choose her Mate, As also, a Wives behaviour towards her Husband after Marriage (Edinburgh, 1618/1619?) to Margaret Home.

In October 1627 she married James Stuart, eldest son of the Earl of Moray, then known as "Lord Doune". She had a nursery for her children in her mother's house in the Canongate of Edinburgh,now known as Moray House. There, her mother had the portraits of Lord and Lady Doune in the gallery, and portraits of her two eldest daughters with their companion, the dwarf Meg Candie, as standing figures or "dummy boards" in the room overlooking the garden.

They refurbished their house at Donibristle, employing English artisans including painters, Edward Arthur and George Crawford, and installed a fountain with a bronze figure of Mercury balanced on a tortoise ringed around with lead flower pots. At Donibristle House the cabinet treasures included an early and luxurious telescope, bought in London in 1634 for £15 sterling. Books included volumes of sermons and a work penned by Esther Inglis. 

In 1652 she made over lands in Moray from her dowry or terce to her husband, so that he could sell them to meet their debts.

The Countess lived as a widow till 1683, she maintained Moray House in Edinburgh and its gardens, and planted woods at Donibristle. The writer Thomas Kirk saw the Mercury fountain in 1677. After her death, her factor, the lawyer Hugh Paterson, found a fortune in gold hidden in a cupboard at the Canongate. Paterson built Bannockburn House for himself near Stirling.

In 1677 and 1679 there were portraits of "Lord Doune" in "Her Grace's Bed Chamber" at Ham House, possibly of this Lord Moray before 1638 as "Lord Doune" or his nephew, James, also Lord Doune, who married Katherine Tollemache in December 1677. A portrait of Katherine, Lady Doune at Ham was the work of Lodewijk van der Helst. Ham belonged to Lady Moray's brother-in-law, John Maitland, 1st Duke of Lauderdale, whose first wife was her sister Anne Home.

Family
Their children included: 
 James Stuart, Lord Doune.
 Alexander Stuart, 5th Earl of Moray, who married Emilia Balfour
 Francis Stuart of Cullello
 Archibald Stuart of Dunearn, who married Anna Henderson, daughter of John Henderson of Fordell
 Margaret Stuart, who married Alexander Sutherland, 1st Lord Duffus
 Henrietta Stuart, who married Hugh Campbell of Calder 
 Anne Stuart 
 Anne Stuart, who married David Ross of Balnagown
 Mary Stuart, who married Archibald Campbell, 9th Earl of Argyll, at the Canongate in 1650

External links
 Copying a recipe book in 1633

References

Moray
17th-century Scottish women
1683 deaths